Sir William Augustus Forbes Erskine  (30 October 1871 – 17 July 1952) was the first British ambassador to the Republic of Poland.

Career
William Erskine, second son of Walter Erskine, 11th Earl of Mar, was educated at Eton College and Magdalen College, Oxford. He joined the Foreign Office in 1894 and served at Buenos Aires, Teheran, Rome and Stockholm where he was chargé d'affaires in 1913. He was posted to Athens with the rank of Counsellor of Embassy 1913–17 where he was British delegate to the international financial commission which had been established following the Greco-Turkish War (1897) to oversee the public finances of Greece. He was Counsellor at Rome 1917–19, Minister to Cuba 1919–21 (and concurrently to Haiti and the Dominican Republic), Minister to Bulgaria 1921–27, and Minister to Poland 1928–29, continuing there as Ambassador 1929–34 after the post was raised from legation to embassy. He was the first ambassador to Poland since the time of King Jan III Sobieski in the seventeenth century.

Honours
Erskine was appointed MVO in 1906 after attending the then Prince of Wales (later King George V) to Madrid for the marriage of King Alfonso XIII to Princess Victoria Eugenie of Battenberg. He was knighted KCMG in 1926 and raised to GCMG in 1930 when he was also made a member of the Privy Council.

References
ERSKINE, Rt Hon. Sir William (Augustus Forbes), Who Was Who, A & C Black, 1920–2007; online edn, Oxford University Press, Dec 2012
Sir William Erskine (obituary), The Times, London, 19 July 1952, page 6

External links

 

1871 births
1952 deaths
William Augustus Forbes
Younger sons of earls
People educated at Eton College
Alumni of Magdalen College, Oxford
Ambassadors of the United Kingdom to Cuba
Ambassadors of the United Kingdom to Haiti
Ambassadors of the United Kingdom to the Dominican Republic
Ambassadors of the United Kingdom to Bulgaria
Ambassadors of the United Kingdom to Poland
Members of the Privy Council of the United Kingdom
Knights Grand Cross of the Order of St Michael and St George
Members of the Royal Victorian Order